One out of many may refer to:

 E pluribus unum, a Latin phrase meaning "Out of many, one", "One out of many" or "One from many
 "One out of many" (V.S. Naipaul), a 1971 short story written by V.S. Naipaul